The Argeșel is a left tributary of the river Râul Târgului in Romania. Its source is near the Păpușa Peak, in the Iezer Mountains. It discharges into the Râul Târgului in Mioveni. The following towns and villages are situated along the river Argeșel, from source to mouth: Nămăești, Suslănești, Boteni, Lunca, Balabani, Lespezi, Lucieni, Hârtiești, Dealu, Vulturești, Bârzești, Voroveni, Davidești, Conțești, Racovița and Mioveni.

References

Rivers of Romania
Rivers of Argeș County